Eulasiona comstocki is a species of bristle fly in the family Tachinidae.

Distribution
Canada, United States, Mexico.

References

Dexiinae
Insects described in 1892
Diptera of North America
Taxa named by Charles Henry Tyler Townsend